Muckle may refer to:

People 
Ansetta Muckle de Chabert (1908–1976), businesswoman and activist from Saint Croix, U.S. Virgin Islands
John Muckle (born 1954), writer of fiction, poetry, and literary criticism

Places 
Muckle Bluff, a bluff on the south coast of Elephant Island in the South Shetland Islands of Antarctica
Muckle Flugga, a small rocky island north of Unst in the Shetland Islands, Scotland
Muckle Flugga Lighthouse, punctuates the rocky stack of Muckle Flugga, in Shetland, Scotland
Muckle Green Holm, uninhabited island in the North Isles of the Orkney archipelago in Scotland
Muckle Holm (disambiguation), the name of a number of islands in Orkney and Shetland
Muckle Holm, Yell Sound, small island in Shetland
Muckle Roe, island in Shetland, Scotland, in St. Magnus Bay, to the west of Mainland, Shetland
Muckle Skerry, the largest of the Pentland Skerries that lie off the north coast of Scotland
Muckle Ward, the highest hill in Vementry, an uninhabited island in Shetland, Scotland
Muckle Water, long, narrow fresh water loch on Ward Hill on Rousay, Orkney, Scotland

Other 
Muckle men or Finn-men were Inuit sighted around the north of Scotland
Muckle–Wells syndrome (urticaria-deafness-amyloidosis syndrome), a rare autosomal dominant disease
Muckle Snippeck or Eurasian woodcock (Scolopax rusticola), a medium-small wading bird in subarctic Eurasia
Muckle Spate (1829), flood in August 1829 which devastated much of Strathspey in northeast Scotland

See also
Willcock v Muckle
MUCL (disambiguation)
Muck (disambiguation)
Mucke